A part (or voice) generally refers to a single strand or melody or harmony of music within a larger ensemble or a polyphonic musical composition.
There are several senses in which the word is often used:
 the physical copy of printed or written sheet music given to any individual instrument or voice (as opposed to the full score which shows all parts in the same document). A musician's part usually does not contain instructions for the other players in the ensemble, only instructions for that individual.
 the music played by any group of musicians who all perform in unison for a given piece; in a symphony orchestra, a dozen or more cello players may all play "the same part" even if they each have their own physical copy of the music. This sense of "part" does not require a written copy of the music; a bass player in a rock band "plays the bass part" even if there is no written version of the song.
 any individual melody that can be abstracted as continuous and independent from other notes being performed simultaneously. Within the music played by a single pianist, one can often identify outer parts (the top and bottom parts) or an inner part (those in between). On the other hand, within a choir, "outer parts" and "inner parts" would refer to music performed by different people. See the section Polyphony and Part-writing below.
 a section in the large-scale form of a piece. See the section Musical form below.

Polyphony and part-writing

Part-writing (or voice leading) is the composition of parts in consideration of harmony and counterpoint. In the context of polyphonic composition the term voice may be used instead of part to denote a single melodic line or textural layer. The term is generic, and is not meant to imply that the line should necessarily be vocal in character, instead referring to instrumentation, the function of the line within the counterpoint structure, or simply to register.

The historical development of polyphony and part-writing is a central thread through European music history. The earliest notated pieces of music in Europe were gregorian chant melodies. It appears that the Codex Calixtinus (12th century) contains the earliest extant decipherable part music. Many histories of music trace the development of new rules for dissonances, and shifting stylistic possibilities for relationships between parts.

In some places and time periods, part-writing has been systematized as a set of counterpoint rules taught to musicians as part of their early education. One notable example is Johann Fux's Gradus ad Parnassum, which dictates a style of counterpoint writing that resembles the work of the famous Renaissance composer Palestrina. The standard for most Western music theory in the twentieth century is generalized from the work of Classical composers in the common practice period. For example, a recent general music textbook states,

Polyphony and part-writing are also present in many popular music and folk music traditions, although they may not be described as explicitly or systematically as they sometimes are in the Western tradition.

Musical form
In musical forms, a part may refer to a subdivision in the structure of a piece. Sometimes "part" is a title given by the composer or publisher to the main sections of a large-scale work, especially oratorios. For example, Handel's Messiah, which is organized into Part I, Part II, and Part III, each of which contains multiple scenes and one or two dozen individual arias or choruses.

Other times, "part" is used to refer in a more general sense to any identifiable section of the piece. This is for example the case in the widely used ternary form, usually schematized as A–B–A. In this form the first and third parts (A) are musically identical, or very nearly so, while the second part (B) in some way provides a contrast with them. In this meaning of part, similar terms used are section, strain, or turn.

See also
 Partbook
 Cantus firmus

References

Melody
Musical texture
Polyphonic form
Voicing (music)
Formal sections in music analysis